Kevin S. Hensley is an American politician. He is a member of the Delaware House of Representatives from the 9th district, serving since 2014. He is a member of the Republican party.

References

External links
Campaign site

University of Delaware alumni
Republican Party members of the Delaware House of Representatives
21st-century American politicians
Living people
Year of birth missing (living people)